Siddipet Assembly constituency is a constituency of Telangana Legislative Assembly, India. It is one of 4 constituencies in Siddipet district. It is part of Medak Lok Sabha constituency.

Harish Rao.T, current Finance Minister of Telangana is representing the constituency.

Mandals
The Assembly Constituency presently comprises the following Mandals:

Members of Legislative Assembly 
Members of Legislative State Assembly, who represented Siddipet.

Election results

Telangana Legislative Assembly election, 2018

Trivia
 K. Chandrashekar Rao, the first Chief Minister of Telangana represented the constituency six times.
 Bura Vikram set a new record in the state politics by getting a majority over 100,000 votes in 2018 by polls.

See also
 Siddipet
 List of constituencies of Telangana Legislative Assembly

References

Assembly constituencies of Telangana
Siddipet district
Siddipet